Jean da Silva Duarte, commonly known as Jean Carioca (born 1 September 1978) is a retired Brazilian football defender.

Career
Born in Rio de Janeiro, thus also often known as Jean Carioca (in Portuguese Carioca means natural in Rio), he played for his home town clubs Botafogo de Futebol e Regatas and Madureira Esporte Clube before moving to Moto Club de São Luís, a club where he will often return during his career. He played with Sampaio Corrêa Futebol Clube before moving abroad in February 2003 to join Serbian club OFK Beograd playing back then in the First League of Serbia and Montenegro. After returning to Brazil he represented Moto Club and Associação Atlética Luziânia before signing a one year contract in December 2005 with Ceilândia Esporte Clube, Moto Club and Sampaio Correia, before joining Grêmio Barueri Futebol in 2008. Afterwards he played again with Ceilandia, Moto Club before joining Rio Branco Football Club in May 2009.

Honours
Moto Club
Campeonato Maranhense: 3x
Grêmio Barueri
Campeonato Paulista: 2008

Rio Branco
Campeonato Acriano: 2010, 2011, 2012

References

External sources
 
 Stats in Futpédia
 Profile in Holdingsa

Living people
1978 births
Footballers from Rio de Janeiro (city)
Brazilian footballers
Association football defenders
Botafogo de Futebol e Regatas players
Madureira Esporte Clube players
Moto Club de São Luís players
Sampaio Corrêa Futebol Clube players
OFK Beograd players
Expatriate footballers in Serbia and Montenegro
Ceilândia Esporte Clube players
Grêmio Barueri Futebol players
Rio Branco Football Club players